Ardozyga microdora is a species of moth in the family Gelechiidae. It was described by Edward Meyrick in 1904. It is found in Australia, where it has been recorded from Western Australia.

The forewings are light grey, somewhat sprinkled with dark grey. The stigmata are dark fuscous, with the plical obliquely beyond the first discal. The costa posteriorly with obscure indications of alternate whitish and darker spots. The hindwings are light grey, darker posteriorly.

References

Ardozyga
Moths described in 1904
Taxa named by Edward Meyrick
Moths of Australia